The region of German Lorraine ( or Deutschlothringen) was the German-speaking part of Lorraine, now in France, that existed for centuries until into the 20th century. The name is also used more specifically in to refer to Bezirk Lothringen, that part of Lorraine that belonged to the German Empire from 1871 to 1918.

Former German-speaking Lorraine 
The Germanic-Romance (German-French) language boundary in Lorraine roughly followed the line from Sarrebourg (Saarburg)  to Hayange (Hayingen) until well into the 20th century. A detailed map of the boundary is given in the article on the Lorraine Franconian dialect. The Lorraine region northeast of this linguistic boundary in the present-day départements of Moselle and Bas-Rhin (the Alsace bossue) and in the present-day federal state of Saarland was called German Lorraine (Deutsch-Lothringen). Nancy, the historic capital of Lorraine, and Metz, the present capital of the region of Lorraine, both lie on the French side of the boundary. There are clues to the historic boundary in the names of settlements like Audun-le-Tiche (Deutsch-Oth or German Audun) and Audun-le-Roman (Welsch-Oth or Romance Audun) or the names of the two headstreams of the Nied, the Nied Allemande (Deutsche Nied or German Nied) and the Nied Française (Französische Nied or French Nied), which lie on either side of the language boundary and merge almost exactly on the line itself.

The linguistic boundary was also reflected early on in the administration of the region. In the 13th century, the Duchy of Lorraine was divided into three bailiwicks (administrative and juridical districts. German: Ballei, French: Bailliage): the Bailiwick of Nancy (Bailliage de Nancy), the Bailiwick of Vosges (Bailliage des Vosges) and the German Bailiwick (Bailliage d'Allemagne); the last-named periodically had its administrative seat in the town of Wallerfangen in present-day Saarland. The Duchy of Lorraine went to France in 1766. In 1790, during the time of the French Revolution, the old administrative structures were radically changed. The request by German Lorraine members of parliament to establish a German Lorraine département did not gain majority support in the French  National Assembly. So in 1790, German Lorraine was incorporated into the newly created départements of Moselle and Meurthe. Other German-speaking parts of historic Lorraine lay in the département of Forêts formed in 1795 and the Département de la Sarre created in 1798. In the Second Treaty of Paris in 1815 the largest part of German Lorraine remained with France. From then on the name referred to this region.

Bezirk Lothringen as part of the German Reich 1871-1918 

After the Franco-Prussian War in 1871, part of Lorraine was annexed by the newly founded German Empire and, together with Alsace formed the Imperial Territory of Alsace-Lorraine (Reichsland Elsaß-Lothringen) until 1918. The newly formed Bezirk Lothringen, which was created from parts of the former French départements of Meurthe and Moselle, covered not just the majority of historical German Lorraine but also the French-speaking regions west of the Franco-German language boundary around Metz and Château-Salins. Bezirk Lothringen, with Metz as its capital, remained unchanged in its territorial composition after the return of the region to France in 1919 and formed the present département of Moselle. During the German occupation of 1940–1944 it became the CdZ-Gebiet Lothringen ("Territory of the Chief of Civil Administration of Lorraine").

References

External links
 Petition about bilingual teaching in primary schools, French and German, Strasbourg, 1869, pdf, 4.2 MB
 Project Deuframat: German-French material for the teaching of history and geography

Lorraine-German people
Central German languages
Geography of Grand Est
History of Lorraine